The Kosovo Railways Museum is a museum in Fushë Kosova, Kosovo. It was founded in September 2006 and is housed in the Fushë Kosova Railway Station as the largest railway station in Kosovo and headquarters of Kosovo Railways.

See also 
 Kosovo Railways
 Fushë Kosova Railway Station

External links 
 Kosovo Railways Museum (Official website)
 Eisenbahn im Kosovo 1874 bis heute (Kosovo Railways Fanpage, German)

References 

Kosovo Polje
Museums in Kosovo